Pabitra Dutta (born 27 November 1969 in Sibsagar, Assam) is an Indian cricketer who played domestic cricket for Assam cricket team. He is a right-handed batsman.
Dutta made his first-class debut for Assam in the 1987/88 Ranji Trophy. He played 33 first-class matches and 13 List A matches. After retirement he is involved in coaching. He coached the Assam under 23 team.

References

External links

 

1969 births
Living people
Indian cricketers
Assam cricketers
People from Sivasagar
Cricketers from Assam
People from Assam
Cricket coaches
Assamese people